Bansi is a city in the Siddharthnagar district in the state of Uttar Pradesh, India.

Bansi may also refer to:

Places
 Bansi, Nepal, a Village Development Committee in Dailekh District in the Bheri Zone of western-central Nepal
 Bangshi River, a river in central Bangladesh

People
 Bansi Lal (1927–2006), political leader from the state of Haryana, India
 Bansi Chandragupta (1924–1981), art director of Indian film industry
 Bansi Kaul (born 1949), well-known Hindi theatre director
 Bansi Pandit (born 1942), writer and speaker on Hinduism
 Bansi Quinteros (1976–2018), trance keyboardist from Barcelona, Spain
 Anna Barbara Bansi (1777–1863), Swiss-born French painter
 Praz Bansi, British professional poker player
 Bansi Ponnappa, Indian military officer and UN peacekeeper
 Bansi Lal Sharma (died 1990), geoscientist

Meteorology
 Cyclone Bansi, the second named tropical cyclone of the 2014–15 South-West Indian Ocean cyclone season